Malapatan, officially the Municipality of Malapatan, is a 1st class municipality in the province of Sarangani, Philippines. According to the 2020 census, it has a population of 80,741 people.

Malapatan is bounded on the west by Sarangani Bay, on the east by Davao Occidental, on the north by Alabel, and on the south by Glan.

Geography

Barangays
Malapatan is politically subdivided into 12 barangays.
 Daan Suyan
 Kihan
 Kinam
 Libi
 Lun Masla
 Lun Padidu
 Patag
 Poblacion (Malapatan)
 Sapu Masla
 Sapu Padidu
 Tuyan
 Upper Suyan

Climate

Demographics

Inhabited by Christians, Muslims as well the indigenous people of Sarangani. Malapatan is a great illustration of how different religious beliefs can harmoniously co-exist. It is also the home of the famous Blaan "dreamweavers" who craft sleeping mats using the designs they have dreamt about.

Economy 

The economy of Malapatan is largely based on agriculture with a high level production of copra (dried coconut meat). Animal husbandry is the second biggest income earner, notably cattle farming. Other agricultural products are coconuts, maize, sugarcane, bananas, pineapples, mangoes, eggs, beef, fish.

The economy has accelerated in the past decade driven by advances in global communication technology and the finishing of a modern highway that tremendously improved trade and transport.

References

External links
Malapatan Profile at PhilAtlas.com
Malapatan Profile at the DTI Cities and Municipalities Competitive Index
Malapatan Municipal Profile at the Province of Sarangani Official Website
[ Philippine Standard Geographic Code]
Philippine Census Information
Local Governance Performance Management System

Municipalities of Sarangani